David Hughes (born 1971 in Säffle, Sweden) is a Jazz fusion/Smooth jazz electric and acoustic bass player and composer of Swedish/Scottish origin. He is based in Los Angeles, California, since 1994.

David Hughes is an acclaimed sideman and session musician. He has played with the likes of Christopher Cross, Jazz Crusaders, David Benoit, Keiko Matsui, Chaka Khan, Melissa Etheridge, Burt Bacharach and Connie Stevens and Ray Manzarek (the Doors). He also played on countless sessions for TV and radio and for films such as Firehouse Dog and Old School (film), in which he also appeared.

Early years

Hughes began playing piano at age six, switched to violin at age eight and picked up the bass guitar at age 11. In high school he started playing the double bass as well.

Training
After studies at the Royal College of Music, Stockholm, Hughes left for Los Angeles to study at Musicians Institute. Shortly after graduating 1995 he joined the teaching staff for a few years. He studied privately with Gary Willis, Jeff Berlin, Carol Kaye and Todd Johnson.

Solo Projects 

David Hughes has released two albums largely featuring his own compositions. He often uses six-string fretted and fretless bass guitars. The two extra strings provide an expanded range suitable for playing melodies, solos, and chords.

Swoosh
His debut album Swoosh (2003) included guest appearances of David Benoit, Wilton Felder, Greg Mathieson and Allen Hinds and the musical style ranges from funky jazz to symphonic classical.

Foreign Shores
On the CD Foreign Shores (2007) Hughes has with more complex compositions and live, interactive performances. The album offers a fusion of modern jazz and funk, with enthusiastic exploration by the album's performers - i.a. Eric Marienthal, Gregg Karukas, Katisse Buckingham, Andy Suzuki, Jamey Tate, and on vocals, Justin Guarini.

External links
Official website
Smoothviews Foreign Shores review
Smoothviews Foreign Shores review
All About Jazz
www.smooth-jazz.de review

1971 births
Royal College of Music, Stockholm alumni
Swedish bass guitarists
Swedish people of Scottish descent
Living people
21st-century bass guitarists